The 1953 SMU Mustangs football team represented Southern Methodist University (SMU) as a member of the Southwest Conference (SWC) during the 1953 college football season. Led by first-year head coach Woody Woodard, the Mustangs compiled an overall record of 5–5 with a mark of 3–3 in conference play, placing fourth in the SWC. SMU played home games at the Cotton Bowl in Dallas. Jack Gunlock and Jerry Clem were the team captains.

Schedule

Personnel
Raymond Berry

References

SMU
SMU Mustangs football seasons
SMU Mustangs football